Dondelange is a village in the commune of Kehlen, in south-western Luxembourg.  The village has a historic chapel, and a large historic mansion. , the village has a population of 143.  The surnames Dondlinger, Dondelinger, and Donndelinger are derived from the name of this village.

Kehlen
Villages in Luxembourg